Frank Mandel (1884 – April 20, 1958) was an American playwright and producer. He co-wrote several productions. Some of his works were adapted by others. Several of his collaborations were adapted into films. UCLA's libraries have a collection of his papers.

He was born Frank Armand Mandel in San Francisco. He attended the University of California where he was interested in the public speaking society, the Student's Congress and debating team, as well as being active in the Glee Club, along with Richard Walton Tully. H graduated in 1904 with a Bachelor of Letters degree then enteres Hastings Law School. After his education he started selling suits with his father, working in real estate, and writing plays. When real estate took a dive after the 1905 earthquake and fire he got together $5,000 and headed East to write plays.

After writing No, No, Nanette, he formed the production team of Schwab and Mandel with Laurence Schwab. They produced works such as Follow Thru, Good News, The Firebrand and America's Sweetheart.

He died on April 20, 1958, in Hollywood.

Theater
My Lady Friends (1919) co-author with Emil Nyiray
The Five Million, co-author
Mary, co-author with Otto Harbach; score by Louis Hirsch
No, No, Nanette (1925) co-author with Otto Harbach
The O'Brien Girl (1922)
The New Moon
The Desert Song
Tickle Me (play)
America's Sweetheart (musical) (1931)
East Wind (musical)
Follow Thru (musical) (1929)

Filmography
The Desert Song (1929 film)
No, No, Nanette (1930 film)
New Moon (1930 film)
Follow Thru (1930)
Good News (1947 film)
Tea for Two (film) (1950)
The Desert Song (1953 film)

References

1884 births
1958 deaths
20th-century American dramatists and playwrights
Writers from San Francisco
20th-century American male writers
American theatre managers and producers